F-tax is a tax paid by a self-employed person in Sweden.

Sole proprietors (sole traders) in Sweden who actively conduct business usually hold an F-tax certificate, which signifies that the sole proprietors themselves are liable to pay their own corporate taxes and social security contributions every month.

When a business is approved for F-tax, the business owner's customers are not required to deduct taxes on payments made for work performed in Sweden.

See also 

 Swedish Tax Agency
 Taxation in Sweden
 Swedish Taxpayers' Association

References

Taxation in Sweden